Maysan, is an Iraqi football club based in Maysan Governorate.

External links
 Club's page on Goalzz.com

1963 establishments in Iraq
Football clubs in Maysan